The Mirage-Treasure Island Tram is a  people mover connecting the adjacent Las Vegas Strip casinos The Mirage and Treasure Island. The tram takes about 90 seconds to go from one end to the other, and is free to ride.

The tram opened in 1993 along with the opening of the Treasure Island casino. At the time both Treasure Island and The Mirage were owned by Mirage Resorts.

Route
Caesars Palace would not permit the tram to cross its property. The tram runs from the front of the Mirage to the rear of Treasure Island.

Technical

The tram consists of a single elevated track, with a single 2-car train running back and forth between the two stations. It uses rubber tyres and is cable hauled. It operates as a fully automated guideway system. The train has a total capacity of 120 passengers. One-way capacity is 1,800 passengers/hour.

The tram was built by VSL and Lift Engineering of Carson City. In 2020 it was extensively overhauled by Jakes associates.

See also

Transit 

The Deuce (transit bus service)
Las Vegas Monorail

Resort trams 

Aria Express
Mandalay Bay Tram

References 

Transportation in Las Vegas
Las Vegas Strip
Cable railways in the United States
Passenger rail transportation in Nevada